Jānis Liepiņš (August 9, 1894 – September 2, 1964) was a Latvian painter from Riga. He studied at J Madernieks Studio in Riga between 1909 and 1910, at the Kazan Art School 1911–1913, and at M Bernstein's Studio in St Petersburg 1913–1917.  He was a member of the Riga Artists' Group and Professor of painting at the Art Academy of Latvia 1940–1950.  During the 1920s Liepiņš was active in the left-wing press.

Liepiņš is credited with having introduced a fisherman's theme in Latvian genre painting, he also created still lifes of various subjects (tavern scenes, gamblers, peasants' life) drawing attention to the social aspects.

References

1894 births
1964 deaths
Artists from Riga
People from Kreis Riga
Soviet painters
20th-century Latvian painters
People's Artists of the Latvian Soviet Socialist Republic (visual arts)
Burials at Forest Cemetery, Riga